Combocerus is a genus of beetles belonging to the family Erotylidae. Its only species is Combocerus glaber.

The genus was first described by Bedel in 1868.

The species of this genus are found in Europe.

References

Erotylidae